Margo McDermed is an American politician.

Education 
In 1973, McDermed earned a BA in Communications from Simmons College. In 1976, McDermed earned a JD in law from DePaul University College of Law.

Career 
McDermed is a Republican member of the Illinois House of Representatives who represents the 37th district. The 37th district, located in the Chicago metropolitan area, includes all or parts of Frankfort, Frankfort Square, Homer Glen, Ingalls Park, Mokena, New Lenox, Orland Park, and Tinley Park.

McDermed was an attorney working in the petroleum industry for thirty years before retiring. Prior to her election to the Illinois House of Representatives, she served as the Township Collector, a Township Trustee, and Township Clerk in Frankfort Township and a member of the Will County Board.

McDermed opted not to run for reelection in 2020 and stepped down on January 4, 2021 with several days remaining in the 101st General Assembly. The Republican Representative Committee of the Republican Party of the 37th Representative District appointed Tim Ozinga, winner of the 2020 general election to serve the remainder of McDermed's term.

Electoral history

Personal life 
McDermed's husband is Edward. They have two children.

References

External links
 Official profile at Illinois General Assembly
 Margo McDermed at votesmart.org

Living people
DePaul University College of Law alumni
Simmons University alumni
Republican Party members of the Illinois House of Representatives
People from Mokena, Illinois
Women state legislators in Illinois
Year of birth missing (living people)
21st-century American politicians
21st-century American women politicians